The Union Pacific Big Boy is a type of simple articulated 4-8-8-4 steam locomotive manufactured by the American Locomotive Company (ALCO) between 1941 and 1944 and operated by the Union Pacific Railroad in revenue service until 1962.

The 25 Big Boy locomotives were built to haul freight over the Wasatch Range between Ogden, Utah, and Green River, Wyoming. In the late 1940s, they were reassigned to Cheyenne, Wyoming, where they hauled freight over Sherman Hill to Laramie, Wyoming. They were the only locomotives to use a 4-8-8-4 wheel arrangement: four-wheel leading truck for stability entering curves, two sets of eight driving wheels and a four-wheel trailing truck to support the large firebox.

Today, eight Big Boys survive, with most on static display at museums across the USA. One of them, No. 4014, was re-acquired by Union Pacific, and between 2014 and 2019 it was rebuilt to operating condition for the 150th anniversary of the first transcontinental railroad. It thus regained the title as the largest and most powerful operating steam locomotive in the world.

History

Design
In 1936, Union Pacific introduced the Challenger-type (4-6-6-4) locomotives on its main line over the Wasatch Range between Green River and Ogden. For most of the route, the maximum grade is 0.82% in either direction, but the climb eastward from Ogden, into the Wasatch Range, reached 1.14%. Hauling a  freight train demanded double heading and helper operations, which slowed service. So Union Pacific decided to design a new locomotive that could handle the run by itself: faster and more powerful than the compound 2-8-8-0s that UP tried after World War I, able to pull long trains at a sustained speed of  once past mountain grades.

A Union Pacific design team led by Otto Jabelmann, the head of the Research and Mechanical Standards section of the Union Pacific's Mechanical Department, worked with ALCO (the American Locomotive Company) to re-examine their Challenger locomotives. It was designed to travel smoothly and safely at 80 miles per hour.

To achieve these new engineering goals, the Challenger locomotive was "comprehensively redesigned from first principles," wrote locomotive historian Tom Morrison. The overall design simplified some aspects of previous locomotive designs and added complexity elsewhere. Compounding, booster, and feed water heaters were eliminated, as were Baker valve gear and limited cut-off. But the "proliferation of valves and gauges on the backhead showed that running a Big Boy was an altogether more complicated and demanding task for the crew than running previous existing locomotives," Morrison wrote.

The 4-8-8-4 class series, originally rumored to be called the "Wasatch", after the Wasatch Mountains, acquired its nickname after an unknown ALCO worker scrawled "Big Boy" in chalk on the front of No. 4000's smokebox door, then under construction as the first of its class.

The Big Boys were articulated, like the Mallet locomotive design, although lacking the compounding of the Mallet. They were built with a wide margin of reliability and safety, and normally operated well below  in freight service. The maximum drawbar pull measured during 1943 tests was  while starting a train.

The Big Boy has the longest engine body of any reciprocating steam locomotive, longer than two 40-foot buses. They were also the heaviest reciprocating steam locomotives ever built; the combined weight of the  engine and  tender outweighed a Boeing 747.

Construction
The American Locomotive Company manufactured 25 Big Boy locomotives for Union Pacific: 20 in 1941 and five in 1944. Along with the Challengers, the Big Boys arrived on the scene just as traffic was surging in preparation for American participation in World War II.

Operation

The Big Boy locomotives had large grates to burn the low-quality bituminous coal supplied by Union Pacific-owned mines in Wyoming. Water was injected into the boiler by a Nathan type 4000C Automatic Restarting injector (up to 12,500 gallons per hour) on the right side and an Elesco T.P. 502 exhaust steam injector (up to 14,050 gallons per hour) on the left side. A Big Boy could consume 11 tons of coal and 12,000 gallons of water an hour operating at maximum power.

As an experiment, No. 4005 was converted to burn oil in 1946. Unlike a similar effort with the Challengers, the conversion failed due to uneven heating in the Big Boy's large, single-burner firebox. The locomotive was converted back to coal in 1948. (Decades later, No. 4014 would be successfully converted to oil during its restoration.) Another experiment saw No. 4007 being modified with a single stack in October 1948. The results were unsatisfactory, and the locomotive was reverted to double stack after testing. One final short-term experiment was the fitting of smoke deflectors on locomotive 4019, similar to those found on the railroad's FEF Series, as well as some of their Challengers. These were later removed, as the Big Boys' nozzle and blower in the smoke box could blow smoke high enough to keep engineers’ lines of sight clear.

The locomotives were held in high regard by crews, who found them sure-footed and more “user friendly” than other motive power. They were capable machines, and their rated hauling tonnage was increased several times over the years. But postwar increases in the price of coal and labor, along with the advent of efficient, cost-effective diesel-electric power, spelled the end of their operational lives. Nonetheless, they were among the last steam locomotives withdrawn from service on the Union Pacific. The last revenue train hauled by a Big Boy ended its run early in the morning on July 21, 1959. Most were stored operational until 1961; four remained in operational condition at Green River, Wyoming until 1962. Their duties were assumed by diesel locomotives and gas turbine-electric locomotives.

In 2019, Union Pacific completed the restoration of No. 4014 and placed it in excursion service. The locomotive was sent on a tour in celebration of the 150th anniversary of the completion of the First transcontinental railroad.

Accident
The engineer and fireman were killed on impact; the brakeman died of severe burns in a hospital a few days later. The tender destroyed the cab of the locomotive, and the loads from the 18 derailed cars were scattered. The locomotive was repaired by Union Pacific at its Cheyenne facility and returned to service until 1962.

Preservation
Most of the 25 Big Boys were scrapped, but seven remain on static display—two indoors and five outdoors, under the elements—and an eighth, Union Pacific 4014, was rebuilt to operating condition by Union Pacific's steam program.

See also
 Union Pacific Challenger
 Union Pacific FEF Series
 Union Pacific Heritage Fleet
 EAR 59 class – The world's largest metre-gauge steam locomotive, operated by East African Railways

Notes and references

Notes

Citations

References

Further reading

External links

UP Steam

4-8-8-4 locomotives
4000
ALCO locomotives
Simple articulated locomotives
Railway locomotives introduced in 1941
Steam locomotives of the United States
Freight locomotives
Standard gauge locomotives of the United States